The Grammy Award for Best Performance by a Vocal Group or Chorus was awarded from 1959 to 1960.  In 1961 the award was split into two awards for Best Performance by a Vocal Group and Best Performance by a Chorus. 

Years reflect the year in which the Grammy Awards were presented, for works released in the previous year.

1959
1st Annual Grammy Awards winner: Keely Smith and Louis Prima for "That Old Black Magic"

Other nominees:
 Kirby Stone Four – Baubles, Bangles, and Beads
 The King Sisters – Imagination
 Lambert, Hendricks, and Ross – Sing a Song of Basie
 The Kingston Trio – "Tom Dooley" lyrics

1960
2nd Annual Grammy Awards winner: Richard Condie (choir director), for "The Battle Hymn of the Republic", performed by the Mormon Tabernacle Choir

Other nominees:
 Ames Brothers – The Ames Brothers Sing Famous Hits of Famous Quartets
 The Kingston Trio – The Kingston Trio at Large
 The Browns – "The Three Bells" lyrics

References

1959 establishments in the United States
1960 disestablishments in the United States
Awards established in 1959
Awards disestablished in 1960
Performance by a Vocal Group or Chorus